The Merrill-Magee House, also known as The Merrill Magee Inn, is a historic home located at Warrensburg, Warren County, New York.  It was built in three phases: the original -story, Greek Revival–style farmhouse built about 1835; the 2-story main block with giant portico added about 1855; and the 1911 addition of a -story farmhouse, originally built in 1815, attached to the west end of the original dwelling.  Also in 1911, a shed-roofed frame kitchen was added.  Also on the property are a woodshed (c. 1890), ice house (c. 1875), smokehouse (c. 1855), carriage barn (c. 1875), garage / servant's quarters (c. 1925), swimming pool (1927–28), chicken coop (c. 1910), and the landscaping.  It has been used as a restaurant and inn since the 1980s.

It was added to the National Register of Historic Places in 1985.

References

External links
Merrill Magee Inn website

Houses on the National Register of Historic Places in New York (state)
Greek Revival houses in New York (state)
Bed and breakfasts in New York (state)
Houses completed in 1835
Houses in Warren County, New York
National Register of Historic Places in Warren County, New York